Quảng Thành may refer to the following places in Vietnam:

Quảng Thành, Bà Rịa–Vũng Tàu, a commune of Châu Đức District
Quảng Thành, Thanh Hóa, an inner ward and an outer commune of Thanh Hóa city
Quảng Thành, Quảng Ninh, a commune of Hải Hà District
Quảng Thành, Thừa Thiên-Huế, a commune of Quảng Điền District